Linderiella massaliensis is a species of fairy shrimp in the family Chirocephalidae. It is found in Europe and Northern Asia (excluding China).

References

Further reading

 

Anostraca
Articles created by Qbugbot
Crustaceans described in 1988